Miho: Journey to the Mountain is an album by Paul Winter Consort, released in 2010 through the record label Living Music. The album was commissioned by the Miho Museum in Shiga, Japan to be a musical celebration of the museum. The museum is a unique piece of architecture, built on the top of a mountain, and partially tunneling into it, giving the experience of the museum being part of the Earth. The album was recorded in the corridors of the museum, which are naturally reverberant. In 2011, the album earned the group a Grammy Award for Best New Age Album.

Track listing
 "Saxophone (Song of Miho)"	  	
 "Sarangi (Dawn Raga)"		
 "Arto (Before It's Too Late)" 		
 "English Horn (Theme from "On the Central Steppes of Asia", Borodin)"
 "Koto"
 "Frame Drums (Cedar Grove Dance)"
 "Bansuri & Saxophone"
 "Yangjin (Words of Wish Fulfillment)"
 "Bendir and Heckelphone"
 "Saxophone Reprise"
 "Arto (Singing to the Mountain)"
 "The Welcome (Song of Miho)"
 "Koto Spring"
 "Elephant Dance"
 "Whale Raga"
 "Love Is Not in Your Mind"
 "Twilight"
 "Andante (Bach)"
 "Remembering"
 "Saturday Night in Peach Blossom Valley"
 "Song of Miho"
 "Morning Sun"

Personnel
 Paul Winter – soprano saxophone
 Paul McCandless – oboe, English horn, heckelphone, bass clarinet
 Don Grusin – keyboards
 Jordan Rudess – keyboards
 Tim Brumfield – piano, organ
 Eugene Friesen – cello
 Glen Velez – percussion,  bendir, riq, tar, shaker
 Café – percussion
 Arto Tuncboyaciyan – vocals, percussion, sazabo
 Dhruba Ghosh – sarangi
 Steve Gorn –bansuri
 Yukiko Matsuyama – koto
 Eriko Koide – carillon
 Yangjin Lamu – voice
 Shumei Taiko Ensemble
 Shumei Chorus conducted by Hiroko Matsui
 Worcester Polytechnic Institute Chorus conducted by Wayne Abercrombie

References

2010 albums
Grammy Award for Best New Age Album
Living Music albums
Paul Winter Consort albums